Koi Mere Dil Se Poochhe (translation: Someone ask my heart) is a 2002 Indian Hindi romance thriller movie directed by Vinay Shukla, released on 11 January 2002, starring Aftab Shivdasani and introducing Esha Deol in the lead roles. Sanjay Kapoor is featured as the villain. Jaya Bachchan, Anupam Kher, Juliet Alburque, Jaspal Bhatti and Rajpal Yadav are featured in supporting roles. The film is a remake of the 1997 Telugu movie Pelli.

Synopsis 
Designer Aman Puri (Aftab Shivdasani) is the only son of the Puri family. His dad (Anupam Kher) wants him to marry, but Aman insists that he will not marry unless he meets the girl of his dreams. While trying to design his final project, he sees Esha Singh (Esha Deol), a fellow student at his college. Aman does his best to strike up a friendship with Esha, but she adamantly refuses him. His father, unable to see Aman hurt, decides to speak with Esha's mother, Mansi Devi (Jaya Bachchan). Mansi Devi assures Aman's father that she has no objections about Aman's intentions toward Esha. She then speaks to Esha, telling her there is nothing wrong with returning Aman's friendship.

Aman and Esha fall in love and are planning to get married. At Aman and Esha's engagement ceremony Dushyant (Sanjay Kapoor) shows up saying that he is Mansi Devi's son. Esha upon seeing Dushyant becomes extremely frightened. It turns out that Dushyant is indeed Mansi Devi's son and Esha is his wife. On their honeymoon Dushyant attempted to get her gangraped and film the scene. Esha escaped believing that Dushyant died. She returned to Mansi Devi and told her the truth about her son. Mansi Devi and Esha moved to another town, pretending to be mother and daughter. Now, Dushyant vows to destroy Esha's life. Aman finds out the truth and vows that nothing can stop him from marrying Esha.

On Esha's marriage day, Mansi Devi goes to Dushyant with Kheer (rice pudding), which she has especially made for him. Dushyant not trusting her asks her to eat it first. She does and then he eats it as well. It turns out that the pudding was poisoned. Dushyant dies a most horrific and painful death due to the high levels of concentration of the poisons that he had inadvertently ingested. After witnessing Aman and Esha's wedding ceremony Mansi Devi dies. Hence, she re-unites two lost souls and saves their never ending love.

Cast 
Jaya Bachchan as Mansi Devi 
Sanjay Kapoor as Dushyant, Eisha's 1st husband.
Aftab Shivdasani as Aman Puri, Eisha's 2nd husband.
Esha Deol as Eisha Singh
Juliet Alburque as Anna 
Jaspal Bhatti as Naraaz Shankar 
Anupam Kher as Mr.Puri, Aman's father.
Rajpal Yadav as Raj Naidu

Soundtrack

Box office

The film didn't do well at the box office, collecting only 2.7 crores and was declared a disaster.

Awards and nominations 
Bollywood Movie Awards
Bollywood Movie Award - Best Female Debut: Esha Deol

Filmfare Awards
Filmfare Award for Best Female Debut: Esha Deol

IIFA Awards
IIFA Award for Star Debut of the Year - Female: Esha Deol

Star Screen Awards
Screen Award for Most Promising Newcomer – Female: Esha Deol

References

External links 
 

2000s Hindi-language films
2002 films
Hindi remakes of Telugu films
Indian romantic drama films
Films scored by Rajesh Roshan
Indian romantic thriller films
2002 romantic drama films
2000s romantic thriller films